Mimulicalyx is a genus of flowering plants belonging to the family Phrymaceae.

Its native range is China.

Species:

Mimulicalyx paludigenus 
Mimulicalyx rosulatus

References

Phrymaceae
Lamiales genera